Rothonay is a commune in the Jura department and Bourgogne-Franche-Comté region of eastern France.

Population

See also
Communes of the Jura department

References

Communes of Jura (department)